The exquisite rainbowfish (Melanotaenia exquisita) is a species of fish in the family Melanotaeniidae endemic to Australia. It occurs in freshwater habitats of the Northern Territory, typically in running water. It grows to  standard length.

References

exquisite rainbowfish
Freshwater fish of the Northern Territory
Endemic fauna of Australia
exquisite rainbowfish
Taxa named by Gerald R. Allen
Taxonomy articles created by Polbot